Lucian L. Niemeyer is an American consultant and government official who served as Assistant Secretary of Defense for Energy, Installations and Environment from 2017 to 2021. He was nominated for the position by President Donald Trump in June 2017 and was confirmed by the United States Senate on August 1, 2017, by voice vote. On June 26, 2019, after a reorganization within the Office of the Secretary of Defense, Niemeyer became Acting Assistant Secretary of the Navy for Energy, Installations and Environment.

Early life and education
Raised in Aston, Pennsylvania, Niemeyer is a 1987 graduate of the University of Notre Dame with a Bachelor of Architecture degree.

Military career
Niemeyer is a retired United States Air Force officer with fifteen years of active service and five years in the Air National Guard.

Civilian career
Prior to assuming his current role, Niemeyer served as president of the Niemeyer Group, where he advised public and private entities on national defense issues. He was previously a staff member of the United States Senate Committee on Armed Services, where he managed legislative authorizations for military installations and energy and environmental programs, and recommended congressional support for construction, repair, and modernization of military facilities.

He served as Assistant Secretary of Defense for Energy, Installations and Environment from 2017 to 2021. He was nominated for the position by President Donald Trump in June 2017 and was confirmed by the United States Senate on August 1, 2017, by voice vote. On June 26, 2019, after a reorganization within the Office of the Secretary of Defense, Niemeyer became Acting Assistant Secretary of the Navy for Energy, Installations and Environment.

References

External links

Year of birth missing (living people)
Living people
People from Delaware County, Pennsylvania
University of Notre Dame alumni
United States Air Force officers
George Washington University alumni
Naval War College alumni
Trump administration personnel
United States Assistant Secretaries of Defense